Attitudes is the seventeenth solo album by Greek singer Demis Roussos, released in 1982.

Track listing
 "Follow Me (Adagio Movement of the Concierto de Aranjuez)" (Hal Shaper, Herbert Kretzmer, Joaquín Rodrigo)
 "Pretender" (Wayne Hunt)
 "Planet Earth is Blue" (Michael Holm, Tim Rice)
 "Deepest of All" (Jim Taylor, Susan Black)
 "Take My Hand" (Danny Everitt, Engelbert Simons, Klaus Gehrke)
 "Flaming Star" (Wolff-Ekkehardt Stein, Wolfgang Jass)
 "The House of the Rising Sun" (Traditional; arranged by Rainer Pietsch)

Charts

Personnel
Demis Roussos - vocals
Kristian Schultze - synthesizer
Charles Hörnemann - guitars on "Follow Me (Concierto de Aranjuez)"

References

1982 albums
Demis Roussos albums
Mercury Records albums